Agyrtinae is a subfamily in the family Agyrtidae. It contains four genera: Agyrtes (the type genus of the subfamily and the family), Ecanus, Ipelates and Lyrosoma.

References

Staphylinoidea
Beetle subfamilies